The Man with No Name refers to three characters played by Clint Eastwood. 

Man with no name may also refer to:
 "Man With No Name", song by Derek Sherinian from his album Blood of the Snake
 "Man With No Name", song by Johnny Hates Jazz from their album Magnetized
 "Man with No Name", song by Wishbone Ash from their album Elegant Stealth
 "Man With No Name", a twelfth-season episode of ER
 Martin Freeland (known as "Man With No Name"), a Goa trance artist
 Edward Leslie (aka "Ed" Leslie), professional wrestler who wrestled under the ringname "The Man With No Name" in the mid-1990s
 Andrea Jerome Walker, pseudonym for Michael Mvogo, a man currently detained in Canada

See also
No Name (disambiguation)